The Supercopa de Costa Rica is an association football competition held for club football teams in Costa Rica. The Supercopa de Costa Rica is a renewed Champion of Champions tournament in Costa Rica and affirm with the secretary of the Unafut, Jorge Romero, after the Assembly of Presidents and representatives of Costa Rican Primera División.

The first tournament of the re-instated competition was held in 2012, and played at the Estadio Nacional de Costa Rica for the cup match. The objective is to face the champions of the Winter Championship a year before and the year's Summer Super Cup, however, not elect a champion of champions. If the monarch of the two short events is the same, would face the second place in the cumulative table both championships. Similar system used in Europe where they play the champions league before the Cup champions.

Championships

Champion of Champions tournament in Costa Rica

Supercopa de Costa Rica

See also

 Football in Costa Rica

References 

Costa Rica
Football competitions in Costa Rica